Stamatia (Greek: Σταματία) is a Greek feminine given name. Its diminutives are Stamatina, Stamatoula, Matina, Matoula, Mata and Stamato. The masculine form of the name is Stamatis.

People
Elizabeth Stamatina Fey, American comedian

See also
Stamata, a Greek community in East Attica prefecture

References

Greek feminine given names